Associazione Sportiva Dilettantistica Nerostellati Frattese or simply Frattese is an Italian association football club, based in Frattamaggiore Campania. It plays in Serie D.

History
The club was founded in 2012 and played in Promozione Campania in the 2012–13 season, after buying Promozione's club Atletico Bosco sports title, when it was promoted to Eccellenza.

In the next season 2013–14 it was promoted to Serie D.

Colors and badge
The team's color is black with a white star.

Honours
Eccellenza:
Winner (1): 2013–14

References

Football clubs in Tuscany
Association football clubs established in 2012
2012 establishments in Italy